Cerithiopsis tarruellasi is a species of sea snail, a gastropod in the family Cerithiopsidae. It was described by Peñas and Rolán, in 2006.

References

tarruellasi
Gastropods described in 2006